Katerina Alexandre Hartford Graham (born September 5, 1989) is an American actress, singer, dancer and model. She is widely known for her role as Bonnie Bennett on The CW supernatural drama series The Vampire Diaries (2009–2017). Her film credits include The Parent Trap (1998), 17 Again (2009), The Roommate (2011), Honey 2 (2011), Addicted (2014), and All Eyez on Me (2017). In music, Graham was previously signed to A&M/Octone and Interscope Records, and has released two extended plays and two studio albums.

Early life
Graham was born in Geneva, Switzerland, but raised in Los Angeles, California, U.S. Her father, Joseph, is of Americo-Liberian descent, and her mother, Natasha, is Jewish (from a family from Poland and Russia). Graham's father was a music executive and the godfather of two of producer Quincy Jones' children. Her paternal grandfather was a UN Ambassador, serving for 40 years in four countries: The Netherlands, Sweden, Romania and Kenya. Her maternal and paternal grandparents were refugees, from the Holocaust and Liberia, respectively.

Her parents divorced when she was 5 years old. She has a half-brother, Yakov, born in Tel Aviv, Israel. Graham was raised in her mother's Jewish religion and attended a Hebrew school.

Career

Commercials and dancing
Graham began her career in the entertainment industry at age 6. Within the following eight years, she appeared in numerous television commercials, including advertisements for Barbie, Edison, K-Mart, and Pop-Tarts. At age 15, Graham caught the eye of choreographer Fatima Robinson, and was asked to perform at the BET Awards as a background dancer for Bow Wow. Graham followed her BET Awards appearance with work as a background dancer for Missy Elliott, Pharrell Williams, Jamie Foxx, and choreographers Hi-Hat and Michael Rooney. At age 17, Graham participated in a national marketing campaign to advertise Coca-Cola's soda brand Fanta. Graham appeared in the marketing campaign as a member of the "Fantanas", known as Capri, also known as Strawberry. Graham has appeared in various music videos, including Akon's "Lonely", Christina Milian's "Dip It Low", Justin Bieber and Usher's "Somebody to Love (Remix)", 112's "What If", John Legend's "Used to Love U", B2K's "Why I Love You", Musiq Soulchild's "B.U.D.D.Y.", Nelly's "Just A Dream" and Diddy – Dirty Money with Usher's "Looking for Love".

Television and film
 
In 1998, Graham made her film debut as a child star on the remake version of The Parent Trap alongside Lindsay Lohan. Graham plays the role of Jackie, a Camp Walden camper. In 2002, Graham made her television debut on the Disney Channel teen comedy series Lizzie McGuire. Graham went on to appear on various television series, including CSI: Crime Scene Investigation, The O.C., Malcolm in the Middle, Joan of Arcadia, Grounded For Life, and Greek. In 2008, she appeared in the musical comedy series Hannah Montana playing the role of a girlfriend to Jason Earles's character Jackson Stewart as a guest appearance for three episodes. Graham has also had well-known supporting roles in films such as 17 Again and The Roommate. 

In December 2008, Graham began filming sci-fi/dance film Boogie Town in Los Angeles. Filming on the film was put on hold that same month due to payroll issues with background performers. In April 2009, principal photography was stopped due to schedule conflicts with some of her co-stars and other projects. The film is set in a futuristic New York City in 2015 where dance battles are permanently banned. Graham plays the role of Ingrid. The film was set to be released in theaters worldwide October 2011, however it was set to be originally released in June 2009.

In March 2009, Graham was cast in The CW supernatural drama series The Vampire Diaries based on the book series of the same name. Graham plays the role of Bonnie Bennett, a young witch, which is considered her breakout role. The series premiered on September 10, 2009, to 4.91 million viewers and received praise for the series progression from critics. In May 2012, the series was renewed for the show's fourth season. She took over as the female lead in 2015 after the Canadian actress Nina Dobrev departed for the seventh season. In 2011, Graham won "Choice TV Female Scene Stealer" at the Teen Choice Awards for her role on the show. 

In August 2010, The Hollywood Reporter announced that Graham was cast in the Universal Pictures dance drama film Honey 2. The film is a sequel to the 2003 film Honey. The film follows a troubled girl and aspiring dancer who joins a dance crew. The film was released theatrically in selected countries for a limited release and went on to make over  worldwide. In June 2011, the film was released direct-to-DVD in North America to negative reviews from critics though Graham's performance and dancing was praised. Also that year, Graham starred in another dance-oriented film, Dance Fu in which she appeared as the female lead. 

In 2017, she played actress Jada Pinkett Smith in the Tupac biopic All Eyez On Me.

Graham starred in the Netflix romantic comedy films The Holiday Calendar (2018), Operation Christmas Drop (2020), and Love in the Villa (2022).

In 2022, Graham competed in season eight of The Masked Singer as "Robo-Girl". After besting Mario Cantone as "Maize" and Gloria Gaynor as "Mermaid" on "Andrew Lloyd Webber Night", she was eliminated on "Muppet Night" alongside Jerry Springer as "Beetle".

Music

In 2002, she wrote a song titled "Derailed", which was featured in the Jean-Claude Van Damme film of the same title. In 2006, Graham pursued a career as a musical artist. Graham found her break in 2007 when she was featured on "The Donque Song" and "I Got It From My Mama" on singer/rapper will.i.am's third studio album Songs About Girls. The move saw Graham embark on a world tour with The Black Eyed Peas as a supporting act for the Black Blue & You Tour. In April 2010, the song "My Boyfriends Back" released on YouTube and got over 1 million views. In October 2010, Graham released her debut single "Sassy". A music video for the song premiered that same month, but the track performed poorly and it failed to chart. She then went on to release covers of artists such as Janet Jackson and Paula Abdul which garnered Graham the attention of Paula who praised her cover. Graham contributed a cover of the Garbage song "Only Happy When It Rains" to The Vampire Diaries soundtrack. The song premiered in December 2010 in an episode of the series titled "The Sacrifice". In March 2011, Graham released another single titled "I Want It All". The music video released in May 2011.

In February 2012, Graham signed a recording contract with A&M/Octone Records which was marked as her first major label signing. In March 2012, Graham released "Put Your Graffiti On Me". The song itself received positive reviews from critics. In the same month, the official music video premiered and as of October 19, 2012 has reached 4,843,458 views on YouTube. The song peaked at #5 on the US Billboard Hot Dance Club Songs chart. On May 29, Graham performed the track on The Ellen DeGeneres Show. This was marked as her first televised musical performance ever. On that same day Graham released her first EP Against The Wall which debuted at #54 on the iTunes Music Album Chart. Graham is currently in the process of recording her debut album. The second single taken from her debut EP is the track "Wanna Say". The music video was directed by Benny Boom and produced by London Alley. She also appeared on the song "Dog Day Afternoon" from the Ras Kass & Doc Hollywood free collaborative digital album Spit No Evil. On June 25, 2013, Graham gave the opportunity to five fans to release the name of her new single on Twitter, and released the single premiere of "Power" at Billboard.com the next day. "Power" is said to be the lead single from her debut album, which currently does not have a release date. As stated on Billboard.com, Graham also released a new single titled "1991" on March 10, 2015.

Influences
Graham cites the late rapper Tupac Shakur, Destiny's Child, The Beatles, Janet Jackson, M.I.A., Gwen Stefani, Spice Girls, Madonna, Grace Jones, and the late Prince as musical influences. She describes her sound as "vintage 90's with a modern twist."

Personal life
Due to her multilingual upbringing, Graham speaks English, French, and Spanish, as well as some Hebrew and Portuguese.

Graham began dating Cottrell Guidry in 2008; they became engaged in October 2012. By December 2014, they had ended their relationship. In 2022, Graham got engaged to Darren Genet, a producer and director she has been dating since 2017.

Graham has been a vegan since 2012, having previously been vegetarian.

Since 2017, Graham has resided in Atlanta, Georgia, having previously lived in the Hollywood Hills neighborhood of Los Angeles.

Filmography

Film

Television

Discography

Studio albums

Extended plays

Singles

As lead artist

As featured artist

Music videos

As lead artist

As featured artist

Tour
 The Fantanas (2004–2006)
 The Black Eyed Peas Black Blue & You Tour (2007)
 The Vampire Diaries Tour – Q&A With The Cast (2010)
 2012 National Promo Tour (2012)
 Long Hot Summer World Tour (2022)

Awards and nominations

References

External links

 
 

20th-century American actresses
21st-century American actresses
21st-century American singers
21st-century American women singers
Actresses from Los Angeles
African-American actresses
20th-century African-American women singers
African-American women singer-songwriters
African-American Jews
American child actresses
American child models
American contemporary R&B singers
American female dancers
American female models
American women pop singers
American women singer-songwriters
American film actresses
American television actresses
American voice actresses
American people of Liberian descent
American people of Polish-Jewish descent
American people of Russian-Jewish descent
American women record producers
Americo-Liberian people
People of Americo-Liberian descent
Dancers from California
Living people
Swiss emigrants to the United States
Musicians Institute alumni
Record producers from California
Singers from Los Angeles
Synth-pop singers
21st-century African-American women singers
Singer-songwriters from California
1989 births